Rachel Bentley is the International Director of the Chichester-based charity, Children on the Edge, which she has led for three decades. Bentley co-founded Children on the Edge with Dame Anita Roddick (founder of The Body Shop) in response to the Romanian orphanage crisis which occurred in 1990. She has since expanded the organisation to work in countries including East Timor, Burma, Bangladesh, and Bosnia.

Bentley also does occasional consultancy work for agencies including UNICEF in the area of children's rights.

Early life 
Bentley was born in Birmingham, England and spent much of her childhood in Fiji, where her father worked as an engineer for an international development agency. She attended an international school. Her family returned to Britain when she was eleven.

Education 

Bentley has an MSc in Development Management and a Masters of Advanced Studies (MCR) in Children's rights.
 1989 LLB Hons Degree – Law (UK)
 1999 Post-graduate Diploma in Development Management (UK)
 2001 MSc Development Management (UK)
 2006 Masters Advanced Studies in Children's Rights – University of Fribourg and IUKB Sion, Switzerland

Children on the Edge 

In 1990, after witnessing the appalling conditions in Romanian orphanages first hand, Dame Anita Roddick mobilised her company, The Body Shop International,  to help these children. Initially, this involved volunteers like Bentley going to and helping three orphanages in the small village of Hălăucești in Iași County, Romania. Bentley was in the first convoy of volunteers to Romania. This experience marks the beginnings of Children on the Edge.

By 1992 the team had developed considerable expertise in working with institutionalised children, establishing a programme to integrate them back into society. This prompted the organisation, upon invitation, to expand its work into Albania. By 1994  the work spread to Bosnia. It was clear that the organisation was working primarily with vulnerable children, in particular those without parental care. It was then that Rachel Bentley co-founded Children on the Edge.

Since then, they have expanded their reach to include:
 Burma. Helping children who have escaped ethnic cleansing and persecution in Burma as: migrants, refugees and IDPs (internally displaced people) living within Burma and on its borders.
 Port-au-Prince. Enabling children in the post earthquake slums of Port-au-Prince to access sports coaching, mentoring and nutrition.
 Bangladesh. Providing education for working children and Rohingya refugee children in Bangladesh.
 India. Supporting education and child rights programmes for children from the dalit ‘untouchable’ caste in India.
 Lebanon. In response to the Syrian refugee crisis we have also supported the building and running of refugee camp schools for over 300 children in Lebanon.
 Uganda. After a successful pilot project in Soweto slum, Jinja, Uganda which provided safety, education and nutrition to 300 we are now beginning to replicate the success in four new communities and Congolese refugee settlements closer to the border.

Children on the Edge was originally part of The Body Shop Foundation, but became an independently registered charity in 2004. The Body Shop Foundation continued to support the charity and to have some oversight on its use of funds, as of 2007. Its employees were supported in donating to Children on the Edge as of 2011.

References

External links
 
 

British human rights activists
Women human rights activists
Living people
People from Birmingham, West Midlands
Year of birth missing (living people)